Keeline is an unincorporated community in Niobrara County, in the U.S. state of Wyoming.

History
A post office called Keeline was established in 1908, and remained in operation until it was discontinued in 1995. The community was named for George A. Keeline, a cattleman.

References

Unincorporated communities in Niobrara County, Wyoming